Mellau is a town in the Bregenz Forest in the westernmost Austrian state of Vorarlberg, part of the district of Bregenz.

Geography 
Mellau covers an area of 40.55 km2. Mellau lies at the foot of the Kanisfluh mountain which is considered to be the Bregenz Forest's landmark.

History
From 1805 to 1814 Mellau belonged to Bavaria but then reverted to Austria. In 1870 there was a great fire in Mellau: The church, the school, the rectory and 18 other houses were razed. After the Second World War, from 1945 to 1955 the town was in the French zone of occupation.

Population
The municipality has about 1300 inhabitants.

Coat of arms
The coat of arms was designed  by the artist Hubert Dietrich in 1962. It shows an uprooted fir tree, which symbolises the affiliation to the Bregenz Forest, and three crosses, which are a remembrance of the plague.

Tourism 
Thanks to the merging of the two ski areas Damüls and Mellau in 2010, the largest ski area in the Bregenz Forest and one of the largest ski regions in the state of Vorarlberg was created: The ski resort area Damüls-Mellau.

In the summer and autumn of 2015, the Mellau cable car was rebuilt in the form of a monocable.

Bregenzerwald Umgang

This "Bregenz Forest Walking Tour"  offers insights into the architecture and community planning of 12 traditional villages in the Bregenzerwald. While walking over various landscapes, visiting public buildings, homes and everyday objects, walkers gain a comprehensive overview of typical Bregenzerwald architectural styles as they developed throughout the ages.

Trivia 

In Austria, Mellau is known for the song "Vo Mello bis ge Schoppornou" (Alemannic for "From Mellau to Schoppernau") by the Bregenz Forest band Holstuonarmusigbigbandclub.

See also
 Horizon Field

Notable people 

 Norbert Bischofberger (born 1954), scientist, co-developer of the influenza vaccination Tamiflu.
Hubert Dietrich (1930-2006), painter and painting restorer.
 Hermann Rützler (1883-1960), photographer and author.

References

External links
Mellau Homepage
Bregenzerwald Umgang Mellau

Bregenz Forest Mountains
Cities and towns in Bregenz District